The Litany of the Holy Name of Jesus is a formal prayer in the Catholic Church dedicated to the Holy Name of Jesus. It is one of six formal prayers approved by the Catholic Church for public and private use. This Litany carries  a partial indulgence. It is believed that the Litany of the Holy Name of Jesus was written by SS. Bernardine of Siena and John Capistran in the 15th century.

The Litany 
The Litany of the Holy Name of Jesus is said as:
V. Lord, have mercy on us.
R. Christ, have mercy on us.
V. Lord, have mercy on us. Jesus, hear us.
R. Jesus, graciously hear us.
V. God the Father of Heaven
R. Have mercy on us. 
V. God the Son, Redeemer of the world,
R. Have mercy on us.
V. God the Holy Spirit,
R. Have mercy on us.
V. Holy Trinity, one God,
R. Have mercy on us.
V. Jesus, Son of the living God, R. Have mercy on us.
Jesus, splendor of the Father, [etc.]
Jesus, brightness of eternal light.
Jesus, King of glory.
Jesus, sun of justice.
Jesus, Son of the Virgin Mary.
Jesus, most amiable.
Jesus, most admirable.
Jesus, the mighty God.
Jesus, Father of the world to come.
Jesus, angel of great counsel.
Jesus, most powerful.
Jesus, most patient.
Jesus, most obedient.
Jesus, meek and humble of heart.
Jesus, lover of chastity.
Jesus, lover of us.
Jesus, God of peace.
Jesus, author of life.
Jesus, example of virtues.
Jesus, zealous lover of souls.
Jesus, our God.
Jesus, our refuge.
Jesus, father of the poor.
Jesus, treasure of the faithful.
Jesus, good Shepherd.
Jesus, true light.
Jesus, eternal wisdom.
Jesus, infinite goodness.
Jesus, our way and our life.
Jesus, joy of Angels.
Jesus, King of the Patriarchs.
Jesus, Master of the Apostles.
Jesus, teacher of the Evangelists.
Jesus, strength of Martyrs.
Jesus, light of Confessors.
Jesus, purity of Virgins.
Jesus, crown of Saints.

V. Be merciful, R. spare us, O Jesus.
V. Be merciful, R. graciously hear us, O Jesus.

V. From all evil,
R. deliver us, O Jesus.
From all sin, deliver us, O Jesus.
From Your wrath, [etc.]
From the snares of the devil.
From the spirit of fornication.
From everlasting death.
From the neglect of Your inspirations.
By the mystery of Your holy Incarnation.
By Your Nativity.
By Your Infancy.
By Your most divine Life.
By Your labours.
By Your agony and passion.
By Your cross and dereliction.
By Your sufferings.
By Your death and burial.
By Your Resurrection.
By Your Ascension.
By Your institution of the most Holy Eucharist.
By Your joys.
By Your glory.

V. Lamb of God, who takest away the sins of the world,
R. spare us, O Jesus.
V. Lamb of God, who takest away the sins of the world,
R. graciously hear us, O Jesus.
V. Lamb of God, who takest away the sins of the world,
R. have mercy on us, O Jesus.

V. Jesus, hear us.
R. Jesus, graciously hear us.

Let us pray.

O Lord Jesus Christ, You have said, "Ask and you shall receive, seek, and you shall find, knock, and it shall be opened to you." Grant, we beg of You, to us who ask it, the gift of Your most divine love, that we may ever love You with our whole heart, in word and deed, and never cease praising You.

Give us, O Lord, as much a lasting fear as a lasting love of Your Holy Name, for You, who live and are King for ever and ever, never fail to govern those whom You have solidly established in Your love. 
Amen.

See also 
 Prayer in the Catholic Church
 Litany

References 

Litanies